Suswono  (born 20 April 1959) is an Indonesian politician from Tegal, Central Java. He was part of the Second United Indonesia Cabinet and served as Minister of Agriculture in Indonesia  since 22 October 2009. He previously served as Vice Chairman of the Commission IV Parliament for the period 2004-2009 for the Prosperous Justice Party. Suswono a member of the House of Representatives through the local Elections in Central Java.

References

1959 births
Living people
People from Tegal
Agriculture ministers of Indonesia
Prosperous Justice Party politicians
Bogor Agricultural University alumni